The 2019 Strat 200 was a NASCAR Gander Outdoors Truck Series race held on March 1, 2019, at Las Vegas Motor Speedway in Las Vegas. Contested over 134 laps on the  asphalt intermediate speedway, it was the third race of the 2019 NASCAR Gander Outdoors Truck Series season.

Entry list

Practice

First practice

Final practice

Qualifying

Qualifying results

Race

Stage Results

Stage One
Laps: 30

Stage Two
Laps: 30

Final Stage Results

Stage Three
Laps: 74

References

Strat 200
Strat 200
NASCAR races at Las Vegas Motor Speedway